Gold Bar is a residential neighbourhood in south east Edmonton, Alberta, Canada.

The neighbourhood's west boundary is 50 Street.  The northern boundary follows a zig zag path running north east from 50 Street until it reaches the Gold Bar Ravine. The Gold Bar Ravine forms the neighbourhood's eastern and southern boundaries, while 101 Avenue runs just to the south of the neighbourhood.

The community is represented by the Gold Bar Community League, established in 1960, which maintains a community hall and outdoor rink located at 46 Street and 105 Avenue.

Demographics 

Residential development 

While a few of the residences in Gold Bar, according to the 2001 federal census, were built before the end of World War II, two out of every three (66.7%) of all residences in the neighbourhood were built between 1946 and 1960.  Another one in four (22.8%) were built during the 1960s.  The remaining residences in the neighbourhood were built after 1970.

The most common type of residence in the neighbourhood, accounting for four out of every five (79%) of all residences according to the 2005 municipal census, is the single-family dwelling.  Another one in five (18%) are row houses.  There are also a few (3%) rented apartments in low-rise buildings with fewer than five stories.  Almost three out of every four (73%) are owner-occupied with only one out of four (27%) are rented.

Schools 
There are two schools in the neighbourhood.  Gold Bar Elementary School is operated by the Edmonton Public School System.   Mount Carmel Bible School is a private Christian post-secondary school offering a one-year program. The former St. Bede Catholic Elementary School lands were acquired in 2004 by the City of Edmonton and reserved for parkland.

Shopping 
Capilano Mall is located to the south west of Gold Bar in the neighbourhood of Ottewell.

Surrounding neighbourhoods

See also 
 Edmonton Federation of Community Leagues

References

External links 
 Gold Bar Neighbourhood Profile

Neighbourhoods in Edmonton